Jerzy Oskar Stuhr (born 18 April 1947) is a Polish film and theatre actor. He is one of the most popular, influential and versatile Polish actors. He also works as a screenwriter, film director and drama professor. He served as the Rector of the Ludwik Solski Academy for the Dramatic Arts in Kraków for two terms: from 1990 to 1996 and again from 2002 to 2008.

Life and career 
Stuhr was born in Kraków. His ancestors, Leopold Stuhr and Anna Thill, migrated within Austria-Hungary from Mistelbach to Cracow shortly after their wedding in 1879.

Having obtained a degree in Polish literature from the Jagiellonian University in 1970, Stuhr spent the next two years studying acting at the Academy for the Dramatic Arts in Kraków ( often shortened to PWST), where he became a professor.

From the early 1970s, Stuhr appeared in Polish theatre and worked in film productions, making his debut with the role of Beelzebub in Adam Mickiewicz's  directed by Konrad Swinarski.

Having met film director Krzysztof Kieślowski in the mid-1970s, he continued to work with him until Kieślowski's death in 1996. To an international audience, Stuhr may be best known for his minor role as thick-witted hairdresser Jurek in Kieślowski's Three Colors: White, in which he starred alongside Julie Delpy, Janusz Gajos, and Zbigniew Zamachowski. In Poland and nearby countries, he is probably best known for the part of Max in Juliusz Machulski's 1984 dystopian cult comedy  (one of the most popular Polish movies), and – to a younger audience – for lending his voice to the talking donkey in the dubbed Polish version of the Shrek trilogy. Other important films include Kieślowski's The Scar (1976), Camera Buff (Amator, 1979) and Part 10 of The Decalogue series (1988), Machulski's Kingsize (1987), Kiler (1997) and Kiler 2 (1999), and Zanussi's Life for Life (1988). Stuhr also worked with Polish directors Agnieszka Holland, Andrzej Wajda and Krzysztof Zanussi.

In 1985, Stuhr made his own directorial debut staging the Polish version of Patrick Süskind's play The Double Bass, in which he also played the (only) role. In spite of the production's success, it was not until 1995 that Stuhr began directing films as well, with List of Adulteresses based on a novel by Jerzy Pilch. Critics favourably compared his next effort Love Stories (1997) to Kieślowski's work. The film consists of four unconnected episodes with Stuhr playing the lead role in each. Further movies directed by Stuhr are Big Animal (2000 – based on a Kieślowski screenplay), and Tomorrow's Weather (2003). For these two, Stuhr employed the Polish alternative rock band Myslovitz who composed the title tracks and also had walk-on roles in the latter. In an interview with The Krakow Post Stuhr admitted that Italian cinéaste Nanni Moretti influenced his approach to filmmaking.

From 1990 to 1997, and again from 2002, Stuhr held the position of rector at the Kraków National Drama School, where he had learned his craft two decades before. He formally obtained the title of professor in Dramatic Arts in 1994.

Stuhr's son Maciej (born 1975) is an actor in his own right, who has played alongside his father in Kieślowski's Decalogue X (1988),  (2003), and Love Stories (1997). His daughter, Marianna (born 1982) is an artist, painter.

In 2004 he was a member of the jury at the 26th Moscow International Film Festival. He is the chairman of the board of supervisors at Cracow's Józef Tischner Children's Hospice and has been a supporter of this foundation since 2004.

He was head of the jury of the 2nd Odessa International Film Festival which took place in Odessa from 15 to 23 July 2011.

He has worked with RMF FM and has also written books such as Escape forward! and The Stuhrs: Family Stories.

In Autumn 2011 Stuhr suffered what he thought was a severe throat infection, but eventually he was diagnosed with laryngeal cancer. He spent most of the following eight months in hospitals in Gliwice, Kraków and Zakopane, undergoing treatment including surgeries, radiotherapy, and chemotherapy.  His daughter, herself a cancer survivor, advised him to write a diary to keep himself mentally busy during that difficult time. In 2012 it was published by Wydawnictwo Literackie publishing house under the title Tak sobie myślę... (which roughly translates as So I am thinking...). His illness was widely covered by Polish media, and he received feedback from cancer patients around the country for whom his openness was comforting. Eventually he described his cancer as "the most important role of my life". As of April 2013, his cancer is in remission and he resumed both stage and voice acting.

Awards and recognition 
11 November 1997, by decision of President Aleksander Kwaśniewski, in recognition of his prominent addition to Polish national culture Jerzy Stuhr was awarded the Commander's Cross of the Order of Polonia Restituta.

12 November 2008 he received Złota Kaczka (Golden Duck) being chosen the century's best actor of comedy.

Stuhr was appointed to the European Film Award for his fourfold role in Love stories. He is a laureate of the Venice Film Festival. He also has received numerous other Polish and international awards in recognition of his work, including:

Polish Academy Life Achievement Award (2018)
Order of the Smile (2014)
Special Award of the Gdynia Film Festival for his film Obywatel (2014)
Honoris Gratia Award (2012)
Commander's Cross with Star of the Order of Polonia Restituta (2011)
Honorary degree of the University of Silesia in Katowice (2007)
Best Script Award at the Gdynia Film Festival to the film Korowód (2007)
Golden Medal for Merit to Culture – Gloria Artis (2005)
Order of Merit of the Italian Republic (2000)
Paszport Polityki (1997)
Golden Lions Award at the Gdynia Film Festival for his role in the film Love stories (1997)
Special Award of the Gdynia Film Festival for his role in the film Spis cudzołożnic ("List of Adulteresses") (1994)
Golden Cross of Merit (1989)
Witkacy Prize - Critics' Circle Award (1988)

Voice acting

Jerzy Stuhr became very popular with younger viewers after he provided the voice for Donkey in the Polish dubbed version of Shrek (as well as in Shrek 2, Shrek the Third and in video games, based on the Shrek movies). Stuhr also provided the voice of Mushu the dragon in Disney's Mulan and Mulan 2, and for the Larry Laffer character in Larry 7 game.

Filmography

Actor

Director and screenplay writer

Voice

References

External links 

Giuseppe Sedia, An Interview with Jerzy Stuhr , in  The Krakow Post, March 26, 2012.

1947 births
Living people
Male actors from Kraków
Polish film directors
Polish screenwriters
Polish male film actors
Polish male stage actors
Polish male voice actors
Polish people of Austrian descent